"Crime of Passion" is a non-album single by musician Mike Oldfield, released in 1984 on Virgin Records. The song features Barry Palmer performing vocals.

Song analysis 
The front cover features a sepia photograph of Mike Oldfield's mother Maureen, who died in January 1974, ten years before the release of this single. The song was released between Oldfield's albums Crises and Discovery.

The music video for "Crime of Passion" takes place in a surrealistic children's play room featuring books, giant blocks (with letters on them), a girl on a swing, a military drummer and a clown. In the video Oldfield performs in a 'mechanical' fashion with Ovation and Fender Stratocaster guitars, while Palmer sits on a box and sings. The video is available on the Elements – The Best of Mike Oldfield video.

Track listing

7-inch single 
 "Crime of Passion" – 3:37
 "Jungle Gardenia" – 2:44

12-inch single 
 "Crime of Passion" (Extended version) – 4:08
 "Jungle Gardenia" – 2:44

Charts

References 

1984 singles
Mike Oldfield songs
Songs written by Mike Oldfield
Virgin Records singles
1984 songs